Regina is a genus of semiaquatic natricine colubrid snakes known as crayfish snakes, named after their primary choice of diet. The genus consists of two species which are found in the eastern and central United States.

Species
The following two species are recognized as being valid.
Regina grahamii  – Graham's crayfish snake
Regina septemvittata  – queen snake

Description
Both species in the genus Regina have keeled dorsal scales in 19 rows at midbody, and a divided anal plate. The crayfish snakes of the genus Regina have smaller heads than the water snakes of the genus Nerodia.

References

Further reading
 Baird SF, Girard C (1853). Catalogue of North American Reptiles in the Museum of the Smithsonian Institution. Part I.—Serpents. Washington, District of Columbia: Smithsonian Institution. xvi + 172 pp. (Regina, new genus, p. 45).

Regina (snake)
Extant Pleistocene first appearances
Snake genera
Taxa named by Spencer Fullerton Baird
Taxa named by Charles Frédéric Girard